Bedri Karafakioğlu (23 October 1915 – 20 October 1978)  was a Turkish assassinated academic and former Rector of Istanbul Technical University

Early life
He was born in Çorum on 29 October 1915. His father Süheyl Rumi was a civil servant and because of his father's service places, he studied in various schools in different cities. He graduated from Adana highschool. Between 1932–1937 he studied Electrical Engineering in the Istanbul Technical University (ITU). By the scholarship of Turkish PTT, he obtained MS in  Ecola Nationale Supereieur des Telecommunications in Paris, France.

University years
In 1939, he became an associate professor in the newly established faculty of Electrical Engineering of  ITU and in 1948 he became the professor in the same faculty. In 1960 he was elected as the distinguished professor of telecommunications in the same university. Between 1964–1965 he was the dean of the Faculty of Electrical Engineering and between 1965–1969 he was the rector of the university. Between 1072–1976 he taught in Karadeniz Technical University. In 1977 he was reelected as the dean of faculty of Electrical Engineering in ITU.

Other posts
Between 1960–1961 he took part in the Constituent Assembly of Turkey as a representative of the Turkish universities. Between 1963–1968 he served in the administrative board of Turkish Radio and Television Corporation. Also between 1963–1966 he served in the scientific research committee of OECD. Between 1973 -1976 he was a member of Council of Higher Education (Turkey).

Death
Bedri Karafakioğlu was a victim of political chaos during the 1970s in Turkey. On 20 October 1978, he was assassinated while walking on the street in İstanbul.

Books by Bedri Karafakioğlu
There are 11 textbooks by Karafakioğlu all of which were published by the ITU. They are all in Turkish language. 6 of them were written by Bedri Karafakioğlu and 5 of them were translated by him.

Legacy
A street in İstanbul was named after him.

References

People from Çorum
1915 births
1978 deaths
Assassinated Turkish people
Turkish engineering academics
Istanbul Technical University alumni
Academic staff of Istanbul Technical University
Télécom Paris alumni
Rectors of Istanbul Technical University
Political violence in Turkey